The 2005 Canada Cup was a women's rugby union competition held in Ottawa, Canada, between 29 June 2005 – 8 July 2005. It was the sixth tournament held, and the fourth to be called the "Canada Cup"; for the first time the USA did not take part — Canada's opponents were New Zealand and Scotland.

The competition returned to the 2003 format with a three nation round-robin, followed by a final between the top two.

Final table

Results

Group stage

Final

See also
Women's international rugby - includes all women's international match results
Churchill Cup

2005 rugby union tournaments for national teams
2005
2005 in Canadian rugby union
2005 in New Zealand rugby union
2005–06 in Scottish rugby union
2005 in women's rugby union
2005 in American women's sports
2005 in Canadian women's sports
2000 in Scottish women's sport